The 2010 Hertsmere Borough Council election took place on 6 May 2010 to elect members of Hertsmere Borough Council in Hertfordshire, England. One third of the council was up for election and the Conservative Party stayed in overall control of the council.

After the election, the composition of the council was:
Conservative 34
Labour 3
Liberal Democrat 2

Election result
Overall turnout at the election was 64.6%.

Ward results

References

2010 English local elections
May 2010 events in the United Kingdom
2010
2010s in Hertfordshire